The discography of Lebanese singer Fairuz includes a large repertoire of more than 1,500 songs, out of which nearly 800 were released. Fairuz has sold more than 150 million records worldwide.

Around 85 Fairuz CDs, records, and cassettes have been officially released so far. Most songs featured on these albums were composed by the Rahbani brothers. Also featured are songs by Sayed Darwish, Ziad Rahbani, Zaki Nassif, Mohamed Abdel Wahab, Philémon Wehbé, Najib Hankash, and Mohamed Mohsen.

Fairuz's unreleased works are abundant. Most of them date back to the late 1940s, 1950s, and early 1960s and were composed by the Rahbani Brothers (certain unreleased songs, the oldest of all, are by Halim El Roumi). A Fairuz album composed by Egyptian musician Riad Al Sunbati was produced in the 1980s and is yet to be released. It is also thought that there are fifteen unreleased songs composed by Philemon Wehbe.

Studio albums

Musicals, soundtracks, and live albums

Notable compilation albums

Notable singles

Discographies of Lebanese artists
Pop music discographies
Folk music discographies